Throndhjems Theater was a historic theatre in Trondheim in Norway, active between 1861 and 1865. It was the first permanent theatre in Trondhjem.

Previously, theater in Tronhjem had consisted of travelling theatre companies and the amateur society Det Dramatiske Selskab, who had a theater building erected in 1816.  Throndhjems Theater was housed in the Gamle Scene, the theatre building of the Det Dramatiske Selskab.  The theater went bankrupt in 1865. It was eventually succeeded by Trondhjems Nationale Scene (1911-1926) and finally by the 
Trøndelag Teater.

References
 Trøndelag Teater. (2018, 13. mars). I Store norske leksikon. Hentet 11. September 2018 fra https://snl.no/Tr%C3%B8ndelag_Teater.
 Arntzen, Knut Ove & Larsen, Svend Erik Løken. (2018, 19. mars). Norsk Teaterhistorie. I Store norske leksikon. Hentet 10. September 2018 fra https://snl.no/norsk_teaterhistorie.
 https://sceneweb.no/nb/venue/4040/Gamle_Scene-1816-12-20

Theatres in Norway
19th century in Trondheim
Former theatres in Norway
1861 in Norway
1865 in Norway
1861 establishments in Europe
1865 disestablishments in Europe